Orio Canavese is a comune (municipality) in the Metropolitan City of Turin in the Italian region Piedmont, located about 30 km northeast of Turin. As of 31 December 2004, it had a population of 799 and an area of 7.1 km².

Orio Canavese borders the following municipalities: Mercenasco, San Giorgio Canavese, Montalenghe, and Barone Canavese.

Demographic evolution

References

Cities and towns in Piedmont